The 1972 Colgate Red Raiders football team was an American football team that represented Colgate University as an independent during the 1972 NCAA University Division football season. In its fifth season under head coach Neil Wheelwright, the team compiled a 5–4–1 record. Kenneth Nelson and David Palmer were the team captains. 

The team played its home games at Andy Kerr Stadium in Hamilton, New York.

Schedule

Leading players 
Two trophies were awarded to the Red Raiders' most valuable players in 1972: 
 Tom Parr, quarterback, received the Andy Kerr Trophy, awarded to the most valuable offensive player.
 Dave Palmer, defensive tackle, received the Hal W. Lahar Trophy, awarded to the most valuable defensive player.

Statistical leaders for the 1972 Red Raiders included: 
 Rushing: Tom Parr, 721 yards and 12 touchdowns on 145 attempts
 Passing: Tom Parr, 1,206 yards, 83 completions and 9 touchdowns on 169 attempts
 Receiving: Steve Fraser, 535 yards and 4 touchdowns on 29 receptions
 Total offense: Tom Parr, 1,927 yards (1,206 passing, 721 rushing)
 Scoring: Tom Parr, 74 points from 12 touchdowns and 1 two-point conversion
 All-purpose yards: Russell Brown, 886 yards (450 rushing, 267 kickoff returning, 93 punt returning, 76 receiving)

References

Colgate
Colgate Raiders football seasons
Colgate Red Raiders football